Colonia Verónica Anzures is a colonia of Mexico City located in the Miguel Hidalgo borough.  The neighborhood is a residential area but it also houses some office buildings, most importantly the Torre Ejecutiva Pemex.

Location
The neighborhood is bordered by:

Av. Marina Nacional to the northeast, across which is Colonia Tlaxpana and Colonia Anáhuac
Bahía de San Hipólito street on the northwest, across which is Colonia Anáhuac
Av. Ejército Nacional on the south, across which is Colonia Anzures
Circuito Interior Melchor Ocampo on the east, across which is Colonia Cuauhtémoc in the Cuauhtémoc borough

History

During the late years of the 1800s, Chapultepec was still surrounded by ranches, such as the Anzures, Polanco and La Teja ranches and the La Condesa and Los Morales haciendas.

In 1920, the owner of the Los Morales hacienda, Eduardo Cuevas Rubio, dies, leaving in his testament instructions for the partition of the hacienda in five sections. Sections I and II, then the closest to the center of Mexico City, became the colonia Verónica Anzures. An area that, at the time, was known only as La Verónica, due to the proximity of the Calzada de La Verónica (today Circuito Interior Melchor Ocampo).

In the 1950s, Verónica Anzures started to develop as a residential zone, described by anthropologist Luis Barjau as "an urban zone in the Federal District of middle-class pretentious residents, who wanted to emulate the then sumptuous Polanco, but smaller".

Description
Verónica Anzures has, mainly, residential buildings of art deco and colonial revival styles. The colonia also houses several commercial buildings, Torre Ejecutiva Pemex, headquarters of state-owned Pemex, one of the largest petroleum companies in the world and shopping center Plaza de las Estrellas, being the two most important.

From the first decade of the 21st century, the neighborhood has experienced a process of gentrification, resulting in the restoration of old buildings and the construction of new big residential buildings.

References

Cuauhtémoc, Mexico City
Neighborhoods in Mexico City
Tenochtitlan